3:56 Killari (Marathi: 3:५६ किल्लारी) is a Marathi language film directed by Deepak Bhagwat. starring Jackie Shroff, Sai Tamhankar, child actress Gauri Ingawale, Anurag Sharma, Pankaj Vishnu, Shrikant Moghe, Rama Joshi.
The film was released on 21 August 2015.

Plot
An adolescent girl Sharayu (Gauri Ingawale) living happily. Her parents are killed but she is saved. She goes to live with her grandparents at Killari, there she experiences mysterious flashes at various places destroyed during the 1993 earthquake, her grandparents send her to a catholic hostel managed by a Catholic Father (Jackie Shroff), who is helped by a counselor (Sai Tamhankar). What happens next is the story.

Release
The film was released on 21 August 2015.

Soundtrack
The music was composed By Chinar - Mahesh and released by Zee Music Company.

Critical reception

References

External links
 
 3:56 Killari (2015) - Movie | Reviews, Cast & Release Date in ongole - BookMyShow

2015 films
2010s Marathi-language films